Thelma Michelle Adams (née Schwartz; February 7, 1959) is an American author and film critic. She wrote the historical fiction novel The Last Woman Standing. Adams also served as the chair of the New York Film Critics Circle twice, and worked as a contributing editor at Yahoo! Movies, Us Weekly, and the New York Post.

Adams has written for various outlets, including The New York Times, Cosmopolitan, The Huffington Post, and Variety.

Early life 
Thelma Michelle Schwartz was born into a Jewish family in Los Angeles, California to parents, Lawrence and Rosalie Schwartz. In 1981 Adams graduated from UC Berkeley, having majored in history. During this time she was a member of Phi Beta Kappa along with the editor of the campuses writing journal, The Berkeley Poetry Review. Adams went on to get her MBA from UCLA in 1985, before getting her postgraduate degree from Columbia University. While pursuing her education Adams worked in various internship programs with groups like the American History Association and the American Film Institute.

Career
In 1986 Adams married her husband Ranald, before spending the next decade working for various humanitarian and arts groups around the New York area. In 2000 Adams began employment with Us Weekly, soon publishing stories on the entertainment industry in various magazines and publications. During her time working at Yahoo! Movies, Adams was sent to the Oscars to cover the events as their red carpet reporter for three years, interviewing celebrities such as Julianne Moore, Joaquin Phoenix and Oprah Winfrey in the process.

Adams debut novel, Playdate was published in 2011, receiving positive reviews from The New York Times and other critics.

In 2016, Adams published her second book, The Last Woman Standing which become a best seller. The book was noted for its feminist messages, along with its historical accuracy. In July, 2016 Adams went on tour to promote her book.

Personal life
Adams married her husband Ranald Adams, a solution architect for HP, in 1986. Today Adams lives in Hyde Park, New York with her family.

References 

UC Berkeley College of Letters and Science alumni
UCLA Anderson School of Management alumni
Columbia University alumni
1959 births
American film critics
American women film critics
Living people